Cheshire Township may refer to the following places in the United States:

 Cheshire Township, Michigan
 Cheshire Township, Gallia County, Ohio

Township name disambiguation pages